Lego Star Wars: Droid Tales is a five-part Lego Star Wars television mini-series that premiered on Disney XD on July 6, 2015.  It is an animated comedy adventure series depicting the stories and characters from the Star Wars saga.

Plot
In the aftermath of Return of the Jedi, the rebels celebrate their victory against the Galactic Empire by having C-3PO and R2-D2 share their previous encounters throughout the Clone Wars, their affiliation with the Ghost crew from Star Wars Rebels, and their activism against the Galactic Empire. During this time, C-3PO pursues a mysterious person who has abducted R2-D2 which is later revealed to be Lando Calrissian. However, 3PO, R2 and Chewbacca (who was enlisted by 3PO to help find R2) are captured by General Veers and a few surviving Stormtroopers but the trio manage to escape with the help of Admiral Ackbar and return to Endor to celebrate with their friends.

Episodes

Voice cast
 Eric Bauza – Luke Skywalker, FA-4 Droid Pilot, Waiter, Stormtrooper No. 2
 Michael Benyaer – Kanan Jarrus
 Michael Daingerfield – Han Solo, Bossk, Stormtrooper No. 1
 Anthony Daniels – C-3PO
 Trevor Devall – Chancellor / Emperor Palpatine / Darth Sidious, Admiral Ackbar, Jar Jar Binks, Jango Fett, Boba Fett, TionMedon, Garbagedroid No. 2, Battledroid No. 1, Nien Nunb
 Paul Dobson – Ki-Adi-Mundi
 Heather Doerksen – Princess Leia Organa, Shmi Skywalker
 Michael Donovan – Old Obi-Wan Kenobi, Count Dooku, Owen Lars, Captain Panaka, Pilot, Poggle the Lesser, Spaceport Announcer
 Brian Drummond – Watto, Garazeb "Zeb" Orrelios, Admiral Motti
 Andrew Francis – Senator Bail Organa
 Adrian Holmes – Mace Windu, Red Guard No. 1
 Bronwen Holmes – Young Anakin Skywalker
 Tom Kane – Yoda, narrator, Qui-Gon Jinn, Garbagedroid No. 1, Pit Droid, Officer
 Alan Marriott – Agent Kallus
 Kirby Morrow – Anakin Skywalker, General Grievous, Red Guard No. 2, Ithorian Customer
 Colin Murdock – General Veers, Rebel Officer 
 Montana Norberg – Queen / Senator Padmé Amidala
 Nicole Oliver – Hera Syndulla
 Adrian Petriw – Ezra Bridger
 Darien Provost – Twi'lek Kid
 Elysia Rotaru – Sabine Wren
 Matt Sloan – Darth Vader, Stormtrooper
 Lee Tockar – Darth Maul, Nute Gunray, Vizago, Amda Wabo
 Samuel Vincent – Young Obi-Wan Kenobi, Garbagedroid No. 3, Ticketdroid, Battledroid No. 2
 Billy Dee Williams – Lando Calrissian

Broadcast
Lego Star Wars: Droid Tales premiered on August 21, 2015 on Disney XD in Australia and New Zealand.

Home media
The whole series was released on DVD, titled Lego Star Wars: Droid Tales, on March 1, 2016 by Walt Disney Studios Home Entertainment. The series has also been released on the Google Play store at the same time as the DVD release.

The series is also available on the Disney+ streaming service, which launched on November 12, 2019.

References

External links
 
 

2010s American animated television miniseries
2015 American television series debuts
2015 American television series endings
American children's animated comic science fiction television series
American children's animated space adventure television series
American computer-animated television series
Lego Star Wars
Disney XD original programming
English-language television shows
Star Wars animated television series
Animated television shows based on films
Star Wars: Droid Tales
Star Wars: Droid Tales
Television series by Lucasfilm